Pierre Louis de Saffon (1724, France – August 1784, Demerara) was a French duellist who escaped to exile in the Dutch colony of Demerara, now in Guyana, only to later become a wealthy land owner. He had fought his brother in a duel and killed him. He fled to Demerara where he became a penitent exile and later developed into a wealthy planter. He thought it best to leave a lasting memorial of his sorrow for having killed his brother and named two of his estates, Le Repentir — the repenting, and La Penitence — the penitence. 

His will, dated 25 February 1784, and written in French, instructed that the revenue from his estate, after other bequests, be bestowed in perpetuity for the maintenance of 10 poor destitute orphans until they reached the age of 16 years.

References

External links
  De Saffon Trust Act, Laws of Guyana

1724 births
1784 deaths
18th-century French people
Guyanese businesspeople
French emigrants to Guyana